Coonoor is a state assembly constituency in Nilgiris district in Tamil Nadu. Its State Assembly Constituency number is 110. It comes under 'The Nilgiris Lok Sabha constituency'. It is a Scheduled Caste reserved constituency. It is one of the 234 State Legislative Assembly Constituencies in Tamil Nadu, in India.

Madras State

Tamil Nadu

Election results

2021

2016

2011

2006

2001

1996

1991

1989

1984

1980

1977

1971

1967

1962

1957

References 

 

Assembly constituencies of Tamil Nadu
Nilgiris district
Coonoor